Pentacomia is a genus of beetles in the family Cicindelidae, containing the following species:

 Pentacomia biguttata (Dejean, 1825) 
 Pentacomia brasiliensis (Dejean, 1825) 
 Pentacomia brevipennis (W. Horn, 1907) 
 Pentacomia brzoskai Wiesner, 1999 
 Pentacomia championi Bates, 1881 
 Pentacomia chrysamma Bates, 1872
 Pentacomia conformis (Dejean, 1831) 
 Pentacomia cribrata (Brulle, 1837) 
 Pentacomia cupricollis (Kollar, 1836) 
 Pentacomia cupriventris (Reiche, 1842) 
 Pentacomia cyaneomarginata (W. Horn, 1900) 
 Pentacomia degandei (Tatum, 1851) 
 Pentacomia discrepans (W. Horn, 1893) 
 Pentacomia distigma (Dejean, 1825) 
 Pentacomia distincta (Dejean, 1831) 
 Pentacomia drechseli Sawada & Wiesner, 1997 
 Pentacomia egregia (Chaudoir, 1835) 
 Pentacomia horni Schilder, 1953 
 Pentacomia lacordairei (Gory, 1833) 
 Pentacomia lanei (W. Horn, 1924) 
 Pentacomia leptalis (Bates, 1881) 
 Pentacomia nigrimarginata Huber, 1999 
 Pentacomia pearsoni Wiesner, 1999 
 Pentacomia pentacomioides (W. Horn, 1900) 
 Pentacomia prepusula (W. Horn, 1907) 
 Pentacomia procera (Chaudoir, 1860) 
 Pentacomia pseudochrysis (W. Horn, 1929) 
 Pentacomia punctum (Klug, 1834) 
 Pentacomia reductesignata W. Horn, 1905
 Pentacomia rhytidopteroides (W. Horn, 1906) 
 Pentacomia rietscheli Wiesner, 2007 
 Pentacomia rugipennis (Kollar, 1836) 
 Pentacomia sericina (Klug, 1834) 
 Pentacomia smaragdula (Dejean, 1825) 
 Pentacomia speculifera (Brulle, 1837) 
 Pentacomia vallicola Huber, 1999 
 Pentacomia ventralis (Dejean, 1825)

References

Cicindelidae